Moving, released by Rough Trade Records on 27 January 1984, is the third studio album by the Raincoats. It was re-released in the US by DGC Records in 1993, and in the UK by Rough Trade in 1994, with a different track list and altered cover art. On its original release, the album reached No. 5 in the UK Indie Chart. It was their last album for 12 years.

Track listing

Original (1983) 
 "Ooh Ooh La La La"
 "Dreaming in the Past"
 "Mouth of a Story"
 "Honey Mad Woman"
 "Rainstorm"
 "Dance of Hopping Mad"
 "Balloon"
 "I Saw a Hill"
 "Overheard"
 "The Body"
 "Avidoso"
 "Animal Rhapsody"

Reissue (1993/1994) 
 "No One's Little Girl"	
 "Ooh Ooh La La La"
 "Dance of Hopping Mad"
 "Balloon"
 "Mouth of a Story"
 "I Saw a Hill"
 "Overheard"
 "Rainstorm"
 "The Body"
 "Animal Rhapsody"

Personnel 
The Raincoats
 Vicki Aspinall - vocals, organ, bass, piano, violin
 Gina Birch - vocals, bass, guitar, vibraphone
 Ana da Silva - vocals, guitar, percussion
with:
 Harry Beckett - trumpet, flugelhorn
 Richard Dudanski - percussion, drums, balafon
 Michael McEvoy - synthesiser bass on "Animal Rhapsody", horn arrangements
 Paddy O'Connell - bass, tenor saxophone, penny whistle
 Derek Goddard - percussion, bongos, conga, drums
 Roger Freeman - percussion
 Chris "C.P." Lee - trumpet
 Mgotse Mothie - double bass

References 

1984 albums
The Raincoats albums
Albums produced by Adam Kidron
Rough Trade Records albums
Geffen Records albums